Pan Mei (潘美) ( 925 – 20 July 991) was a military general and statesman in the early years of imperial China's Song dynasty. In the 970s, he was the main commander in Song's conquest of Southern Han and also played pivotal roles in the conquest of Southern Tang and Northern Han. Afterwards he fought the Khitan-ruled Liao dynasty on Song's northern border.

In 986 he was demoted by 3 ranks for contributing to the death of fellow Song general Yang Ye during battles against Liao. At this time one of his daughters had married into the imperial House of Zhao. The antagonist Pan Renmei (潘仁美, also known as Pan Hong 潘洪) in the largely fictional Generals of the Yang Family legends is based on Pan Mei from this episode.

Early life
Pan Mei's father Pan Lin (潘璘) was a local militia captain (軍校) in Changshan (常山, around modern Shijiazhuang, Hebei). In his 20s, Pan Mei worked as an usher (典謁) at his hometown of Daming (in modern Hebei) during the Later Han (947–951), and often told his close friend Wang Mi (王密) about his ambitions in taking advantage of the turbulent times for fame and riches.

Career under Later Zhou
After the establishment of Later Zhou in 951, Pan Mei served Chai Rong, the prefect (府尹) of Kaifeng. When Chai became the emperor in 954, Pan was named a court official. He followed Chai on campaigns against the Northern Han kingdom, and after playing a part in the victory at Gaoping, served in the palace commissions. Later he became the military inspector of an expeditionary army preparing to invade the Later Shu kingdom.

Pacifying Yuan Yan
In 960, general Zhao Kuangyin overthrew Later Zhou to found the Song dynasty. As a former friend, Pan was given important tasks by the new emperor and he did not disappoint. First, Pan persuaded military governor Yuan Yan to submit to Song, then supervised the armies in quelling Li Chongjin's revolt in Huainan. Staying behind in Yangzhou after the victory, he was later sent to Qinzhou (秦州, in today's Qin'an County, Gansu) where he became the imperial commissioner of the local militia.

Conquest of Southern Han
In 963, Pan Mei was named the imperial defense commissioner of Tanzhou (today's Changsha) and sent to Hunan to help control the newly conquered province, which borders the Southern Han kingdom to the south. During the next 7 years, Pan pacified rebellious tribes in the southern half of the province and fought off Southern Han incursions in Guiyang and Jianghua.

In 970, Pan was named the commander of the expeditionary force to invade Southern Han. In Fuchuan, he defeated the 10,000-men strong Southern Han army and subsequently took Hezhou. Quickly the Song army conquered Zhaozhou (昭州, in today's Pingle County), Guizhou (桂州, today's Guilin) and Lianzhou, resulting in the surrender of other prefecture leaders along the Xi River.

Pan Mei's forces killed more than 10,000 enemy soldiers in Shaozhou (韶州, today's Shaoguan) to advance to 120 li north of Guangzhou, Southern Han's capital. Around 150,000 Southern Han soldiers were stationed on a hill for a last battle. Pan Mei rested his soldiers and mentioned to his subordinate generals that the enemy's bamboo fences could best be attacked by fire. On a windy night, he dispatched a few thousand brave men to the enemy's gate, each with 2 torches in hands. Soon great flames engulfed the camps, and as the Song forces attacked from both sides, tens of thousands of Southern Han soldiers perished. The Southern Han ruler Liu Chang was captured in Guangzhou, and the invasion ended 5 months after it began.

Pan would remain to pacify the Lingnan territory for three years as the joint prefect of Guangzhou and commissioner of foreign trade.

Conquest of Southern Tang
In 974, Pan Mei led his troops north to Jiangling during the fresh campaign against the Southern Tang kingdom. One month later, he was named the military inspector of the troops under the overall command of Cao Bin and ordered to advance to Qinhuai. Reaching the Yangtze River, Pan Mei did not want to wait for boats to be built. Instead he motivated his troops by saying, "His majesty gave me tens of thousands of brave men, expecting victories. Are we going to let this narrow water deter us?" His men swam across the river and destroyed the enemy.

After this victory, Pan Mei was rewarded and became a commissioner of palace attendants (宣徽北院使).

Death of Yang Ye
In 986, Emperor Taizong of Song ordered a new invasion to retake the Sixteen Prefectures from the Liao dynasty. The campaign was known as "Yongxi Campaign" under the era name of Taizong. Three armies participate the campaign, led by Pan Mei, Yang Ye and Cao Bin. Pan Mei command one of the three armies sent northward. During the first few advance, major victories over Liao forces were scored.

However, from time to time, miscommunications, misunderstanding between the generals and the failure of Cao Bin had led Pan Mei and Yang Ye into disastrous situations. In a failed attempt to thwart an attack from Liao troops, without reinforcement from Pan Mei, Yang Ye was surrounded. His sons died one by one but his sixth son, Yang Yanzhao. As a result, Yang Ye was captured and died three days later.

Following the death of Yang Ye, advantages now fell into Liao's hand. Song forces were pursued all the way to Bianjing, only with firm defenses held by Taizong emperor.

Angered and furious by the death of Yang Ye, a few of Song's military officials were executed, others being thrown into exile. Pan Mei on his own was relegated and demoted to three ranks.

Notes and references

Sources
Primary sources
  
  
Secondary source
 

920s births
991 deaths
Later Zhou people
Song dynasty generals